The 2021 Sibiu Cycling Tour was a road cycling stage race that took place between 3 and 6 July 2021 in and around the city of Sibiu, Romania. It was the 11th edition of the Sibiu Cycling Tour and a category 2.1 event on the 2021 UCI Europe Tour.

Teams 
Two UCI WorldTeams, four UCI ProTeams, twenty-one UCI Continental teams, and the Romanian national team made up the twenty-eight teams that participated in the race. With one further non-starter,  was reduced to four riders, meaning 163 riders started the race. Of these riders, 148 finished the race.

UCI WorldTeams

 
 

UCI ProTeams

 
 
 
 

UCI Continental Teams

 
 
 
 
 
 
 
 
 
 
 
 
 
 
 
 
 
 
 
 
 

National Teams

 Romania

Route

Stages

Prologue 
3 July 2021 – Sibiu to Sibiu,  (ITT)

Stage 1 
4 July 2021 – Sibiu to Păltiniș,

Stage 2 
5 July 2021 – Sibiu to Bâlea Lac,

Stage 3 
6 July 2021 – Sibiu to Sibiu,

Classification leadership table 

 On stage 1, Martin Laas, who was second in the points classification, wore the blue jersey, because first placed Pascal Ackermann wore the yellow jersey as the leader of the general classification.
 On stage 2, Pascal Ackermann, who was second in the points classification, wore the blue jersey, because first placed Giovanni Aleotti wore the yellow jersey as the leader of the general classification. For the same reason, Daniel Turek, who was second in the mountains classification, wore the white jersey, and Karel Camrda, who was second in the young rider classification, wore the blue polka dot jersey.
 On stage 3, Fabio Aru, who was second in the points classification, wore the blue jersey, because first placed Giovanni Aleotti wore the yellow jersey as the leader of the general classification. For the same reason, Meindert Weulink, who was second in the young rider classification, wore the blue polka dot jersey. Because Aleotti and Aru were also first and second, respectively, in the mountains classification, Alexis Guérin, who was third in the mountains classification, wore the white jersey.

Final classification standings

General classification

Points classification

Mountains classification

Young rider classification

Sprints classification

Romanian rider classification

Team classification

References

External links 
 

2021 UCI Europe Tour
July 2021 sports events in Romania
2021 in Romanian sport